The Universal Ballet was founded in Seoul, South Korea in 1984. One of only five professional ballet companies in South Korea, the company performs a repertory that includes many full length classical story ballets, together with shorter contemporary works and original full-length Korean ballets created especially for the company. The company is supported by followers of the Rev. Sun Myung Moon, with Moon's daughter-in-law Julia H. Moon, who was the company's prima ballerina until 2001, now serving as General Director.

According to the New York Times the Universal Ballet is considered to be one of Asia's leading ballet companies.

References

External links
Official website
Interview with Julia Moon

Ballet companies in South Korea
Dance companies in South Korea
Performing groups established in 1984
Unification Church affiliated organizations
Unification Church and the arts